Spotsylvania County Public Schools is a public school district serving Spotsylvania County, Virginia. It consists of 17 Elementary, 7 Middle, and 5 High Schools and has a total enrollment of nearly 24,000 students. The Spotsylvania County School division also has a Career and Technical Center and participates with other local school systems to offer the Commonwealth Governor's School. The district partners with area businesses to develop learning opportunities for the students. Spotsylvania County Public Schools works with the area Parks and Recreation Department to help maintain the area around the Schools (athletic facilities, etc.).

District Overview
Spotsylvania County Public Schools serve all of Spotsylvania County, Virginia. It is one of fastest-growing counties in the commonwealth of Virginia which is reflected in an enrollment increase of more than 27% from 1999 to 2005. As of the 2000 Census, approximately 90,395 people lived in Spotsylvania County.

In 2005, the school division had 3,144 full-time employees including 1,788 teachers with a student teacher ratio of 12.8 to 1.

The quality of education in the district has been on the rise, and an annual review is conducted to ensure quality maintenance. Currently 25 of the district's 28 schools are fully accredited by state standards with the other three accredited with a warning. The district also benefits from the dedicated support of a nonprofit, tax-exempt foundation charged with raising money to strengthen the quality of instructional programs in the district.

History
In 1870, the public education system in Spotsylvania County was established with segregated one-room schools. These schools were gradually abandoned for larger buildings combining both elementary and high schools. The former Spotsylvania High School was a state-of-the-art building when constructed in 1939 for $158,000. During the twentieth century, the school system moved from scattered one-room schools for elementary education to consolidated schools for grades 1–12, to an integrated system in 1968. Until that time, most African-American children attended one-room schools until the John J. Wright Consolidated School opened in 1952. Since 1968, the school system has evolved to the present system of separate elementary, middle, and high schools.

Robert E. Lee High School became the first accredited high school in the County in 1920. It was built in 1914 at Spotsylvania Courthouse. The building was destroyed by fire in 1941.

In Early 2021 Robert E. Lee Elementary changed its name to Spotsylvania Elementary.

In November 2021 the school board decided that any book it deemed to have explicit sexuality be taken out of circulation from school libraries. However a lawyer for the board decided that this would be against the United States Constitution, and the board rescinded the plan.

Scott Baker, the superintendent, announced his resignation in 2021 and planned to leave his post at the termination of his existing contract. In January 2022, the composition of the school board changed due to an election, and the largest faction in members had conservative beliefs. The new board immediately fired Baker despite the fact he had already resigned. In September 2022 the board selected Mark Taylor as the new superintendent; Taylor had no prior experience in the educational sector. A group of parents, including conservative ones, criticized the move.

On January 17, 2023, a fight at the high school received attention on social media with 8 students being arrested and one taken to hospital.

Governance
The school board has seven members elected to oversee the school administration. School board members are elected every four years. One school board member is elected from each magisterial district in the county. The elections are staggered and non-partisan.

The following are the current school board members.

School Board Member Arrested for Forgery
On February 23, 2023, School Board member (and former chairman), Kirk Twigg was arrested on two charges: forging a public record, a felony, and a misdemeanor offense of tampering with a county record. Twigg was indicted by a Spotsylvania grand jury before turning himself in at a magistrate's office. He was released on a personal recognizance bond. Though court records do not state specifically what Twigg is suspected of doing,  both alleged offenses took place on or about June 21 and involve a county contract. Twigg was the chairman of the School Board at that time. Twigg had also received national attention when, during a school board meeting in 2021, he publicly called for burning books stating that he wanted to "see the books before we burn them so we can identify within our community that we are eradicating this bad stuff."

Elementary schools
 Battlefield Elementary School
 Berkeley Elementary School
 Brock Road Elementary School
 Cedar Forest Elementary School
 Chancellor Elementary School
 Courthouse Road Elementary School
 Courtland Elementary School
 Harrison Road Elementary School
 Spotsylvania Elementary School
 Lee Hill Elementary School
 Livingston Elementary School
 Parkside Elementary School
 Riverview Elementary School
 Salem Elementary School
 Smith Station Elementary School
 Spotswood Elementary School
 Wilderness Elementary School

Middle schools
Middle schools in the district are:

 Battlefield Middle School 
 Feeds from: Lee Hill Elementary School, Parkside Elementary School, Battlefield Elementary School, Courthouse Road Elementary School, Cedar Forest Elementary School, and Spotswood Elementary School.
 Feeds into: Courtland High School, Massaponax High School, and Chancellor High School

 Chancellor Middle School - northwest Spotsylvania County.
 Feeds from: Chancellor Elementary School, Battlefield Elementary School, Salem Elementary School, Wilderness Elementary, Smith Station Elementary School and Harrison Road Elementary School
 Feeds into: Chancellor High School or Riverbend High School. 

 Ni River Middle School - far northwest Spotsylvania County; opened in 1999
 Feeds from: Brock Road Elementary School, Chancellor Elementary School and Wilderness Elementary School.
 Feeds into: Riverbend High School and Spotsylvania High School

 Spotsylvania Middle School - eastern Spotsylvania County. 
 Feeds from: Courthouse Road Elementary School, Courtland Elementary School, Spotsylvania Elementary School, Parkside Elementary, and Wilderness Elementary School. 
 Feeds into: Courtland High School, Spotsylvania High School or Massaponax High School. 

 Freedom Middle School - opened 2003, across the street from Smith Station Elementary School.
 Feeds from: Fourthouse Rd Elementary School, Smith Station Elementary, and Wilderness Elementary School. 
 Feeds into: Courtland High School and Chancellor High School  

 Post Oak Middle School - located Spotsylvania High School. The school was opened in 2006 at a cost of $25 million as a replacement for the deteriorating John J. Wright Middle School.
 Feeds from: Livingston Elementary School, Berkeley Elementary School, Spotsylvania Elementary School, Brock Road Elementary School, and Riverview Elementary School
 Feeds into Spotsylvania High School, and Riverbend High School

 Thornburg Middle School
 Feeds from: Riverview Elementary School, Cedar Forest Elementary School, and Lee Hill Elementary School
 Feeds into: Massaponax High School and Spotsylvania High School

High schools
Chancellor High School

 Fredericksburg, Virginia
 Principal: Dr. Abe Jeffers (2022-Present)
 Mascot: Chargers

Courtland High School

 Spotsylvania, Virginia
 Principal: Mr. Cliff Conway
 Mascot: Cougars

Massaponax High School

 Fredericksburg, Virginia
 Principal: Mr. Joseph Gabalski 
 Mascot: Panthers

Riverbend High School

 Fredericksburg, Virginia
 Principal: Dr. Troy Wright
 Mascot: Bears

Spotsylvania High School

 Spotsylvania, Virginia
 Principal: 
 Mascot: Knights

Commonwealth Governor's School

John J. Wright Educational & Cultural Center
John J. Wright Educational & Cultural Center is built on the site of the first high school for black students in Spotsylvania County. The original building, known as the Snell Training School, was built in 1913 by the Spotsylvania Sunday School Union under the leadership of John J. Wright, a prominent county educator.

The original building was destroyed by fire in 1941. Completed in 1952, the John J. Wright Consolidated School was opened to all county black youth in grades 1–12. When the school system integrated in 1968, the school became John J. Wright School, housing the county's entire sixth and seventh grade enrollment.

In 1978, with the closing of Spotsylvania Junior High School and the opening of Battlefield Intermediate School, the eighth grade was moved to the intermediate level.

During 1981–82, while the John J. Wright building underwent extensive renovation, the school occupied the current Marshall Building across from the present day Spotsylvania Middle School. In the fall of 1982, John J. Wright School reopened with many added improvements, including central air conditioning, wall-to-wall carpet and a new kitchen and cafeteria.

With the opening of Spotsylvania Intermediate School in the fall of 1982, John J. Wright Intermediate School began serving the predominantly southern portion of Spotsylvania County, with an approximate enrollment of 700 students in grades six, seven, and eight.

On July 1, 1990, the name John J. Wright Intermediate School was officially changed to John J. Wright Middle School in keeping with the Commonwealth's restructuring plan for middle school education.

In 1991–92, John J. Wright Middle School was recognized by the Virginia Department of Education for its outstanding middle school practices, including reading and public speaking, community involvement, rewards and recognition, and technology education.

During the summer of 1997, two areas of John J. Wright Middle School were dedicated to two long-term employees. The library was dedicated in honor of Dr. Sadie Coates Combs Johnson, a former teacher and librarian for thirty-one years. The athletic fields were dedicated in honor of William H. Poindexter, custodian of John J. Wright Middle School. In April of the following spring, a ceremony was held to dedicate a sign, commissioned and funded by a joint Parent Teacher Organization and community endeavor, identifying the fields behind the school as the William H. Poindexter Athletic Fields.

In 2001, the school board commissioned an architectural firm to propose a plan to renovate and expand JJW's facilities. Due to the cost of the needed improvements and the inability to purchase additional land to expand the athletic fields, the school board decided to build a replacement building for JJW to open in 2006, adjacent to Spotsylvania High School.

In 2008, after extensive renovations and modernization the doors reopened as the John J. Wright Educational and Cultural Center. Today, John J. Wright offers educational services to Spotsylvania County students from Pre-K through 12th Grade.

Spotsylvania Career and Technical Center

The Spotsylvania Career and Technical Center, commonly referred to as SCTC, serves all the High Schools in the Spotsylvania school district. Most students who apply to one of the nineteen programs at the center often commit to a two-year program of study. The SCTC mission statement is "The mission of the Center is to prepare students with the knowledge and skills necessary to enter the workforce directly out of high school or to enter a post-secondary educational or training program that compliments their program of study at the SCTC." Some of the pathway programs students are able to enroll in include Metal Trades, Health and Medical Pathways, Construction Pathways, Video/Media Pathways, Dental Assisting, Medical Assisting, and Veterinary Science.

External links
 Official site

References

 
School divisions in Virginia
Education in Spotsylvania County, Virginia